Herford station is a junction station with four platforms and seven platform tracks in the town of Herford in the German state of North Rhine-Westphalia. It lies on the quadruple track, electrified Hamm–Minden railway, a section of the original route of the historic Cologne-Minden Railway Company.

In Herford Station, the line to Altenbeken branches off to the south and the Ravensberg Railway branches off towards the north to Bünde and Rahden with a connection to the Löhne–Rheine railway.  It is classified by Deutsche Bahn as a category 2 station.

Location

The station is located in Radewiger Feldmark only about 300 metres from the Herford inner city (Radewig). Just a little further, is the MARTa Herford art and design museum opened in 2005. On the way there is the Herford music school. The district administration, the army recruiting office, the tax office, the Technisches Rathaus (a section of the municipal administration dealing with planning and planning approvals), the GoParc discothèque and the Radewig and MARTa-Viertel parking garages are also nearby.

The railway line is elevated so that intersecting streets of the town can run under it. The station is orientated in a largely north–south direction.

History 

Herford was connected by a single-track line built by the Cologne-Minden Railway Company on 15 October 1847. The first provisional station building was built out of brick in 1851. A second track was opened to Bad Oeynhausen in 1853 and to Bielefeld in 1854. The station facilities were rebuilt and the entrance building was extended between 1873 and 1875. A roundhouse with a turntable, water tower and a coal shed were built in 1879 and 1880. The single-track line to Detmold was opened on 31 December 1880. The old station building was replaced by a new building in 1902. The Herford–Kirchlengern line, which has always been single track, was opened on 1 was July 1904.

Construction of two freight tracks between Hamm and Minden started in 1911 and they were taken in operation in stages between 1912 and 1916. The line has had four tracks ever since. In this context, the then ground-level line was placed on an embankment and the level crossings were replaced by bridges.

During the Second World War there was only minor damage that could be repaired relatively quickly. The demolition of the locomotive depot began in 1954.

The main line was electrified in the mid-1960s. The first electrically-hauled train ran through the station on 29 September 1968. This was followed by the electrification of the line to Altenbeken on 27 May 1975 and the connection to Kirchlengern on 20 September 1976.

The wooden roofs on the platforms were replaced with steel roofs and a new freight handling facility was built in 1975/76. In 1987, the station building was heritage-listed.  Since 1988, Intercity trains have also stopped in Herford.  General freight operations were abandoned in 1997.

Services 

The station is served by two Intercity services:

Herford is the second biggest node for regional services after Bielefeld in Ostwestfalen-Lippe and is served by several Regional-Express and Regionalbahn services.

The station is also served by 12 local and regional bus routes.

References 

Railway stations in North Rhine-Westphalia
Art Nouveau architecture in Germany
Railway stations in Germany opened in 1847
Art Nouveau railway stations
Buildings and structures completed in 1902
1847 establishments in Prussia
Buildings and structures in Herford (district)